Events in the year 1844 in Brazil.

Incumbents
 Monarch – Pedro II

Events

Births
March 24 – Padre Cícero

Deaths
 23 February - Martim Francisco Ribeiro de Andrada, politician (b. 1775)

References

1840s in Brazil
Years of the 19th century in Brazil
Brazil
Brazil